Linden Anthony Joseph (born 8 January 1969) is a retired West Indian cricketer. He was a right-handed batsman and was a right-arm fast bowler.

Joseph made his first-class and one-day debuts for Guyana in 1986. For the 1990 County Championship season he was signed by Hampshire County Cricket Club, who he played for one season. Joseph played his final match for Guyana against the touring Australians in 1995.

External links
Linden Joseph on Cricinfo
Linden Joseph on CricketArchive
Lists of matches and detailed statistics for Linden Joseph on CricketArchive

1969 births
Living people
Sportspeople from Georgetown, Guyana
Guyanese cricketers
Hampshire cricketers
Demerara cricketers
Guyana cricketers